Miss Mary Lillian Duke is a 1911 oil on canvas painting by the Spanish painter Joaquín Sorolla.

Description 
The painting is part of the collection of the Nasher Museum of Art in Durham. It depicts a portrait of Mary Lillian Duke (1887–1960), when she was 24 years of age and decided to have a portrait painting of her own. The portrait was painted inside a park, with one of Mary's hand resting on the pedestal of a statue while the other holds a black hat. She was wearing a scarf of the same color that falls on her arms, resembling the color of her hair and creating a magnificent contrast with the light colors that she was wearing. The white dress, reminds of ancient statues from Greek, which are mostly white in colour. To make the portrait more graceful, Mary had a rose pinned on her dress near her chest and the bright red colour of the flower stands out above everything.

Provenance
The painting was one of the four paintings sent by Benjamin Duke to Sorolla, for his residence in New York, which was then under construction. Nicholas Duke Biddle, a relative of Mary Lillian Duke Biddle, donated the painting to Duke University. Since that time, it has belonged to the collection of the Nasher Museum of Art in Durham.

References

Sources
 

1911 paintings
Portraits by Spanish artists
Paintings by Joaquín Sorolla